Lonya Grande District is one of seven districts of the province Utcubamba in Peru.

See also 
 Kuntur Puna
 Q'arachupa

References

1861 establishments in Peru
Districts of the Utcubamba Province
Districts of the Amazonas Region